Leptothyrella may refer to:
 Leptothyrella (brachiopod), a genus of brachiopods in the family Platidiidae
 Leptothyrella (fungus), a genus of funguses in the division Ascomycota, order and family unassigned